Nikola Štulić (born 8 September 2001) is a Serbian footballer who plays as a forward for Sporting Charleroi in the Belgian Pro League.

Career

Partizan
A graduate of the club's youth academy, Štulić made his professional debut for the club on 14 June 2020, coming on as a 69th-minute substitute for Bojan Matić in a 4-1 victory over Čukarički. In July of that year, he signed his first professional contract with the club; a four year deal.

Sporting Charleroi
On 31 January 2023 Štulić signed a contract with Belgian side Sporting Charleroi until June of 2026 for an estimated fee of around €750k.

Career statistics

Club

International

References

External links
 Nikola Štulić at UEFA

2001 births
Sportspeople from Sremska Mitrovica
Living people
Serbian footballers
Serbia youth international footballers
Serbia under-21 international footballers
Serbia international footballers
Association football forwards
FK Partizan players
FK Radnički Niš players
R. Charleroi S.C. players
Serbian SuperLiga players
Belgian Pro League players
Serbian expatriate footballers
Expatriate footballers in Belgium
Serbian expatriate sportspeople in Belgium